Serafin Jan Szota (born 4 March 1999) is a Polish professional footballer who plays as a centre-back for Widzew Łódź.

Career statistics

Club

Notes

References 

1999 births
Living people
People from Namysłów
Polish footballers
Poland youth international footballers
Association football defenders
Lech Poznań players
Zagłębie Lubin players
Odra Opole players
Wisła Kraków players
OKS Stomil Olsztyn players
Widzew Łódź players
Ekstraklasa players
I liga players
III liga players